FoldiMate was a California-based company developing a robotic laundry-folding machine founded in 2012. Their clothes folding machine was aimed to enter the market by the end of 2019. In 2021, the company folded.

History
Foldimate was founded by Gal Rozov, an Israeli software engineer who decided that folding laundry was a tedious chore that could be done effectively by a robot. In 2010, Rozov quit his job as a software developer and product manager and spent two years developing his laundry-folding device. In 2012, he moved to the United States to work with a robotic team in Silicon Valley. By 2013, he had a patented technology. In 2016, after an initial round of investment, he produced the first  prototype. The  prototype presented at CES 2017 generated much interest.

The company exhibited an updated prototype of Foldimate at CES 2018.

In January 2018, BSH Hausgeräte expressed an interest in partnering with Foldimate.

On August 30, 2021, the company sent an email to customers who submitted the $85 deposit informing them that the company has gone bankrupt and is requiring customers to submit a form to get the $85 deposit back. The email was titled "Cessation of Business - Deposit claim NOTICE" and began with the line "I hereby inform you that FoldiMate, inc. (“FOLDIMATE”) ceased its business operations". Customers were required to submit the form by February 1, 2022 with disbursements beginning after February 1, 2022. The customer was asked to supply the deposit amount and date. Payments were offered via PayPal or credit card.

Overview

The FoldiMate is slightly larger than a standard washing machine. According to the developers, it can fold a full wash in less than 4 minutes.

The user clips the piece of clothing on two hooks and the item is pulled into the machine. Then a series of rollers and arms moves in all directions to straighten and fold it. The machine can fold shirts, tops, trousers and dresses, but not small pieces of clothing like  underwear or large items like  sheets. The folded items are returned in a stack through a window at the bottom of the machine.

Previous versions included anti-wrinkling technology and fragrance features, but the product was redesigned and simplified with the aim of readying it for the market by the end of 2019.

See also
 Domestic technology
 Laundroid, another laundry folding machine
 Domestic robot
 Home automation

References

 
Laundry equipment
Home automation
Home appliances
Inventions